The Metaphysical Club: A Story of Ideas in America 2001 book by Louis Menand, an American writer and legal scholar, which won the 2002 Pulitzer Prize for History. The book recounts the lives and intellectual work of the handful of thinkers primarily responsible for the philosophical concept of pragmatism, a principal feature of American philosophical achievement: William James, Oliver Wendell Holmes Jr., Charles Sanders Peirce, and John Dewey. Pragmatism proved to be very influential on modern thought, for example, in spurring movements in modern legal thought such as legal realism.

Development 
The book takes its title from societies for philosophical discussion founded by Peirce, in 1872 in Cambridge, Massachusetts, and in 1879 at Johns Hopkins University. The former was recalled by Peirce 30 years later as being named the Metaphysical Club, the latter officially bore that name.

Menand traces the biography of each of the members, showing ways in which they were connected and how all were influenced by their times and by thinkers such as Ralph Waldo Emerson. The book begins by examining the family history and early life of Oliver Wendell Holmes, Jr., future U.S. Supreme Court Justice, then describes how Holmes, James, Peirce, Dewey, and others were acquainted with each other, and how their association led to James' development of pragmatism.

A main focus of the book is the influence of the American Civil War on Americans in general and on the subjects of this book, as well as how the war inspired pragmatism. For Holmes, the Civil War destroyed his entire perspective on the world and greatly shaped his judicial philosophy, which developed at roughly the same time as Dewey, James, and Peirce were beginning to develop pragmatist ideas.  Other influences treated by the book are the emerging sciences of statistics and evolutionary biology.

Criticism
Menand's portrayal of pragmatism has been criticized by philosophers Susan Haack, Paul Boghossian, and Thomas L. Short. In a review of his earlier anthology Pragmatism: A Reader (1997), Haack criticized Menand's historical introduction for distorting the tradition of classical pragmatism into a form of "vulgar Rortyism". Short, in his review of The Metaphysical Club, echoed Haack and criticized Menand for following Rorty in pushing "the relativistic tendencies in James and Dewey to an extreme, 'postmodern' relativism". After a detailed analysis of the philosophical limitations of Menand's account of pragmatism, Boghossian concluded that "All of this book’s problems can be traced to its author’s weak command of the philosophical ideas whose history he wishes to recount".

See also
The Metaphysical Club

Notes

External links
 The Metaphysical Club publisher site
"Menand brings pragmatists of the Metaphysical Club to life", by Ken Gewertz, Harvard Gazette February 26, 2004
 The Metaphysical Club at Amazon.com
 Shook, John R. (undated), "The Metaphysical Club" at the Pragmatism Cybrary. Includes an account of the Club and individualized accounts of Chauncey Wright, Nicholas St. John Green, Charles Sanders Peirce, Oliver Wendell Holmes, Jr., William James, and Joseph Bangs Warner, along with bibliographies, complete ones in the cases of Wright and Green.
Presentation by Menand on The Metaphysical Club, June 6, 2001

2001 non-fiction books
21st-century history books
Farrar, Straus and Giroux books
History books about philosophy
History books about the United States
Pulitzer Prize for History-winning works
American biographies
Charles Sanders Peirce
Pragmatism
Oliver Wendell Holmes Jr.